Edwin Costley Jellett (November 22, 1860 – March 8, 1929) was an American engineer, botanist, gardener, photographer, artist, and diarist who wrote books and articles about Germantown, Philadelphia, Pennsylvania and its flora. His writing covers Germantown's historic homes, natural environment, gardens, and prominent residents. He was active in the Germantown Horticultural Society and in the Germantown Historical Society. A collection of his papers is held by the University of Pennsylvania and Historical Society of Pennsylvania. Jewett wrote a series of weekly articles titled A Flora of Germantown that was published in Germantown's The Independent Gazette newspaper every Friday for almost 40 weeks in 1903 and covered plants, flowers, and local history noted from his wanderings in Northwest Philadelphia (Germantown). The Awbury Arboretum republished the articles online in celebration of its centennial in 2016. Each week's entry ended with a list of the plants that had been noted including the common and Latin name. He worked as a draughtsman.

Jellett traveled by trolley and train to visit various regional destinations. Jellett was an officer of the Mermaid Club for many years and served as the group's president for several.

Bibliography
Germantown, Old and New: Its Rare and Notable Plants by Edwin C. Jellett 1904
Germantown Gardens and Gardeners by Edwin C. Jellett
Personal Recollections of William Kite by Edwin C. Jellett, 1901 (about the librarian)
The Mermaid of the Past, 1892
Ferns of Germantown, 1896 
The Mermaid Club, its Past and Future, 1897
 Winter Flora of Germantown, 1901
 German-Towne: Its Founders and Their Progenitors, and What We Owe Them, 1903
 A Flora of Germantown, with Notes of Nature and Nature Lovers, 1903

References

1860 births
1929 deaths
Place of birth missing
Place of death missing
Writers from Philadelphia
19th-century American non-fiction writers
20th-century American non-fiction writers